, also known as Kalk Samen Chestnut Flower and Chlorine Semen Chestnut Flower, is the third studio album by Japanese singer-songwriter Ringo Sheena, released on February 23, 2003, on Toshiba EMI / Virgin Music. 
The album's lead single was a massive success, topping the Oricon charts for the first time in her career.

EMI released the album using CCCD at first. Then, the CCCD version was stopped producing, and the CD-DA version was newly released on July 2, 2008.
The  2LP vinyl record version was released on May 27, 2003 and contains the bonus track .

The short film  acts as a visual accompaniment to the album and was released prior to the album on January 22, 2003.

Background and recording 
Kalk Samen Kuri no Hana was released hot off of the success of Ringo's sophomore album Shōso Strip (2000) as well as her self-cover album Utaite Myōri: Sono Ichi (2002). 
The album was originally titled .
However, she decided to change the title at the last minute after being intrigued by an argument she overheard between two male staff members on her team, who bickered over whether the smell of semen more resembled the smell of chlorine or the smell of the chestnut flowers.
She thought that the nuance of the word "semen" was beautiful, and adapted it to the original title, explaining that "Kalk" fit into the original first word of "Wonder", while "Semen" fit "Vulgar", and "Chestnut Flower" fit with "Eccentric".
The 2001 single  was to have been included on the album along with one of the single's b-sides, however these tracks were dropped on the basis of not thematically fitting in with the rest of the album.

Kalk Samen Kuri no Hana saw Sheena producing a major release all by herself for the first time in her career, as opposed to working with her usual collaborators and producer Seiji Kameda. The album allegedly took her an extra year to produce than her previous two studio albums did.
Sheena chose to not record a band all at once as she had done on previous albums, choosing to instead record one instrument at a time by overdubbing and multitracking and layering the instruments.
Musically, the album combines both the standard instrumentation of a rock band as well as various other musical instruments, including folk instruments from Japan and other regions, string instruments, wind instruments, percussion instruments, as well as music sequencer and a full orchestra. 
In order to reduce budgets, she used her own Macintosh computer and cheap recording equipment to compose and edit the songs by herself using computer software, while sometimes exchanging the arranged songs with Uni Inoue. She recorded one musical instrument in one room of her house while recording the ensemble parts (string section, etc.) in another room.

Seiji Kameda, who had been involved in the production and arrangement of her previous two studio albums did not participate in the album whatsoever. Instead, Sheena arranged the album with audio engineer Uni Inoue. Toshiyuki Mori orchestrated each of the recorded songs and arranged the entirety of "Yattsuke Shigoto".

The song titles and their places in the tracklist continue a pattern seen on Ringo's first two albums where each song title symmetrically parallels the opposite side of the tracklist. For instance, tracks 1 and 11 are written with exactly two kanji, tracks 2 and 10 are written with eight katakana characters, and so on.

Reception
Kalk Samen Kuri no Hana was ranked second in CNN International Asia's list of "the 2000s' most under-appreciated Japanese music of the last decade" on December 22, 2009. Sheena also received a mention in The Guardian as one of Japan's artists who "deserve to be seen and heard in the west" in 2010.

Track listing
All tracks written by Ringo Sheena; all tracks arranged by Sheena and Uni Inoue (credited as "Bakeneko Killer"), except "Rush Job" by Toshiyuki Mori, and "Fig Flower" by Ukigumo.

Credits and personnel 
All English translation and pronunciation guidance: Robbie Clark

Track 1 and 11
 : orchestral music
 Yuichiro Goto: conductor
 Kazuhiro Momo (from Mo'some Tonebender): electric guitars
 Junji Ikehata: drums
 Toshiyuki Mori: pipe organ 
 Uni Inoue: electric bass guitars, hurdy-gurdy, mandolin, lute, sitar, Fender B.Bender (3-stringed), drum machine
 Ringo Sheena: vocal, koto (Ikuta style), distortion koto (her own way), pipe organ

Track 2 and 10
 Chestnut Flower Fragrance Orchestra: orchestral music
 Yuichiro Goto: conductor
 Ringo Sheena: vocal
 Uni Inoue: Mellotron, electric bass guitars

Track 3 and 9
 Himitsu Butai: the band
 Ringo Sheena: vocal, bandmaster, percussion
 Ukigumo: electric guitars (Fender Telecaster)
 Ahito Inazawa: drums
 Hitoshi Watanabe: electric bass guitars, contrabass
 Hideyo Takakuwa: 
 Neko Saito: violin
 Tabu (from Soil & "Pimp" Sessions): Didgeridoo

Track 4 and 8
 Kotaro Saito: cello
 Junko Minobe: viola
 Youkan Mizue: conch and other wind instruments 
 Yumi Ōta: the voice of the announcement
 Uni Inoue: electric bass guitars, electric guitars, electronic drum
 Ringo Sheena: vocal, prepared piano, acoustic piano, Erhu (二胡, Chinese instrument with two strings)

Track 5
 Ōoku Kinen Orchestra: orchestral music
 Yuichiro Goto: conductor
 Toshiyuki Mori: piano, all works
 Ringo Sheena: vocal, koto (Ikuta style), distortion koto (her own way), pipe organ 
 Ukigumo: vacuum cleaner (her elder brother Shiina Junpei's wife's possessions)

Track 6
 Josei-jōi Kinen Orchestra: string section
 Chieko Kinpara party: string quintet
 Kanako Tsuruta: drums
 Uni Inoue: electric bass guitar
 Ringo Sheena: vocal, koto (Ikuta style), piano

Track 7
 Ukigumo: vocal percussion
 Toshiyuki Mori: Cornet
 Uni Inoue: electric bass guitar 
 Ringo Sheena: vocal, koto (Ikuta style), shamisen, melodica, alto recorder, kalimba, harmonium, jaw harp, whistle, piano, drums, electric guitars

Track 12
 Ringo Sheena: vocal
 Ukigumo: acoustic guitars
 Uni Inoue: bass

Notes

References

External links 
 

Ringo Sheena albums
2003 albums
Concept albums